Purchaudi Municipality is a municipality of Nepal located in Baitadi District of Sudurpashchim Province of Nepal. The municipality was established on 10 March 2017, when Government of Nepal announced 744 local level units as per the new constitution of Nepal 2015.

Kotila, Bhatana, Bhumiraj, Kuwakot, Nwadeu, Mahadevsthan, Hat, Malladehi, Talladehi and Bijayapur villages were merged to form this new local level unit.

The headquarter of the municipality is situated at Hat town.

References

External links
 http://103.69.124.141/gis
 http://purchaudimun.gov.np

Municipalities in Baitadi District
Nepal municipalities established in 2017